Ardatovo is the name of several rural localities in Russia.

Modern localities
Ardatovo, Republic of Bashkortostan, a village in Maksyutovsky Selsoviet of Kugarchinsky District of the Republic of Bashkortostan
Ardatovo, Republic of Mordovia, a selo in Ardatovsky Selsoviet of Dubyonsky District of the Republic of Mordovia

Historical names
Ardatovo, former name of the town of Ardatov in Ardatovsky District of the Republic of Mordovia